is Maaya Sakamoto's sixteenth single. The title track was used as the opening theme for the popular mecha anime Macross Frontier and won the 2008 Animation Kobe award for best theme song. The single reached number 3 on Oricon weekly chart and so far is the best selling single of Maaya Sakamoto.

In April 2011, the song was certified as a gold download to cellphones by the RIAJ, for legal downloads in excess of 100,000.

Track listing

Charts

References

External links
Victor Entertainment special site

2008 singles
2008 songs
Maaya Sakamoto songs
Victor Entertainment singles
Anime songs
Macross
Songs written by Yoko Kanno